Mark Goldberg (c. 1879 – November 20, 1926) was an American lawyer and politician from New York.

Life 
Goldberg was born around 1879 in New York City. He lived in Manhattan since he was four and was active in local affairs since he was young.

Goldberg attended New York University Law School, graduating with an L.L. B. in 1898 and a L.L. M. in 1899. After he was admitted to the bar, he opened a law office at 302 Broadway.

In 1906, Goldberg was elected to the New York State Assembly as a Democrat, representing the New York County 18th District. He served in the Assembly in 1907, 1908, 1909, 1910, 1911, 1912, 1913, 1914, 1915, 1916, 1917, 1918, and 1919. While in the Assembly, he fought for and successfully passed the restoration of street car transfers and a cheap telephone rate for Greater New York. In 1913, he was a member of a joint legislative committee that devised legislation to prevent misconduct by the New York City Police Department.

Goldberg had a wife and two children. He was a member of the Elks, the freemasons, the Tammany Society, the Royal Arcanum, the Improved Order of Heptasophs, the Hebrew Sanitarium, the Bohemian-American Congregation, the Independent Order Brith Abraham, and the New York County Lawyers' Association. He was a grand marshal of the children's parade for the Hudson-Fulton Celebration.

Goldberg died in St. Luke's Hospital on November 20, 1926. He was buried in Washington Cemetery.

References

External links 
 The Political Graveyard

1870s births
1926 deaths
Year of birth uncertain
Politicians from Manhattan
Lawyers from New York City
Jewish American state legislators in New York (state)
New York University School of Law alumni
20th-century American politicians
Democratic Party members of the New York State Assembly
American Freemasons
Burials in New York (state)
19th-century American lawyers